The Swedish Golf Federation (SGF) is the governing body for the sport of golf in Sweden, founded in 1904.

The federation is responsible for administering the Rules of Golf, as laid down by The R&A, at the national level. It organizes tournaments, manages the national teams, and promotes the game. As of 2022, the federation organized 448 golf clubs and 505,577 individual members with 536 203 memberships, 74.4% male and 25.6% female. This makes it the third largest sports federation in Sweden in terms of active members, behind association football and athletics in first and second and place.

SGF is a member of the European Golf Association (EGA). Thanks to a high national participation rate of almost 5%, SGF is EGA's third largest national member behind England and Germany (661,805 and 640,181 members respectively as of 2016).

See also

 SM Match Play
 Swedish International Stroke Play Championship
 Swedish Golfer of the Year
Swedish Golf Tour (men)
Swedish Golf Tour (women)
 List of Swedish professional golfers

References

External links
 sgf.golf.se, official site

Sweden
Golf associations
Golf
Golf in Sweden
1904 establishments in Sweden
Sports organizations established in 1904